Iran national under-20 football team (also known as Iran Under-20, Iran U-20 or Iran Youth Team) represents Iran in international football competitions in AFC U-19 Championship and FIFA U-20 World Cup, as well as any other under-20 international football tournaments. It is controlled by the Iran Football Federation.

Tournament records

FIFA U-20 World Cup

AFC U-19 Championship

*Denotes draws including knockout matches decided on penalty kicks.**Red border color indicates tournament was held on home soil.

CAFA U-19 Championship

Toulon Tournament

2012 AFF U-19 Youth ChampionshipChampions	

 1978 Toulon Tournament 7th place (out of 8)

Panda Cup
 2017 Panda Cup 3rd place (out of 4)

Results and fixtures

Previous matches

Forthcoming matches

Coaching staff

Players

Current squad
The following 23 players were called up for 2023 AFC U-20 Asian Cup  matches from 1 to 18 March 2023.

Previous squads

FIFA U-20 World Cups
FIFA World Youth Championship 1977 squad
FIFA World Youth Championship 2001 squad
FIFA U-20 World Cup 2017 squad

See also
Iran national football team
Iran national under-23 football team
Iran national under-17 football team

References

Asian national under-20 association football teams
Under-20